The Ryder Cup is a biennial men's golf competition between teams from Europe and the United States. The competition is contested every two years with the venue alternating between courses in the United States and Europe. The Ryder Cup is named after the English businessman Samuel Ryder who donated the trophy. The event is jointly administered by the PGA of America and Ryder Cup Europe, the latter a joint venture of the PGA European Tour (60%), the PGA of Great Britain and Ireland (20%), and the PGAs of Europe (20%).

Originally contested between Great Britain and the United States, the first official Ryder Cup took place in the United States in 1927 at Worcester Country Club in Worcester, Massachusetts. The home team won the first five contests, but with the competition's resumption after the Second World War, repeated American dominance eventually led to a decision to extend the representation of "Great Britain and Ireland" to include continental Europe from 1979. The inclusion of continental European golfers was partly prompted by the success of a new generation of Spanish golfers, led by Seve Ballesteros and Antonio Garrido. In 1973 the official title of the British Team had been changed from "Great Britain" to "Great Britain and Ireland", but this was simply a change of name to reflect the fact that golfers from the Republic of Ireland had been playing in the Great Britain Ryder Cup team since 1953, while Northern Irish players had competed since 1947. In addition to players from Great Britain and Ireland, the European team has since included players from Austria, Belgium, Denmark, France, Germany, Italy, Norway, Spain and Sweden.

Since 1979, Europe has won eleven times outright and retained the Cup once in a tied match, whilst the United States won nine times over the same period. Since 1979, Europe has won four times away on foreign soil (in 1987, 1995, 2004 and 2012), whilst the United States has won twice away on foreign soil (in 1981 and 1993). From 1995 to 2014, Europe won eight out of ten Ryder Cups.

The Ryder Cup, its alternate-year non-European counterpart (the Presidents Cup), and its women's equivalent (the Solheim Cup) remain exceptions within the world of professional sports because the competing professionals receive no prize money, despite the contests being high-profile events that bring in large amounts of money in television, sponsorship, ticketing and merchandise revenue.

The 2021 Ryder Cup was held on the Straits course at Whistling Straits, Haven, Wisconsin, from 24 to 26 September 2021. The United States defeated Europe 19–9, to clinch the largest margin of victory in the modern history of the event (since the inclusion of Continental Europe in 1979).

The Ryder Cup was held in odd-numbered years until 1999, but it then moved to even years in 2002 after being cancelled in 2001 due to the 9/11 terrorist attacks. It moved back to odd years again in 2021, after the 2020 event was postponed due to the COVID-19 pandemic.

Founding of the Cup

Gleneagles 1921
On 27 September 1920 Golf Illustrated wrote a letter to the Professional Golfers' Association of America with a suggestion that a team of 12 to 20 American professionals be chosen to play in the 1921 British Open, to be financed by popular subscription. At that time no American golfer had won the British Open. The idea was that of James D. Harnett, who worked for the magazine. The PGA of America made a positive reply and the idea was announced in the November 1920 issue. The fund was called the British Open Championship Fund. By the next spring the idea had been firmed-up. A team of 12 would be chosen, who would sail in time to play in a warm-up tournament at Gleneagles (the Glasgow Herald 1000 Guinea Tournament) prior to the British Open at St. Andrews, two weeks later. The team of 12 was chosen by PGA President George Sargent and PGA Secretary Alec Pirie, with the assistance of USGA Vice-president Robert Gardner.

The idea for a 12-a-side International Match between the American and Great Britain professionals was reported in The Times on 17 May, with James Douglas Edgar being reported as the probable 12th player. Edgar was already in the United Kingdom. The match would be played at Gleneagles on Monday 6 June, the day before the start of the 1000 Guinea Tournament. With Jim Barnes indisposed, the match eventually became a 10-a-side contest, Edgar not being required for the American team. The match consisted of 5 foursomes in the morning and 10 singles in the afternoon, played on the King's Course. The match was won by Great Britain by 9 matches to 3, 3 matches being halved.

The British team was: George Duncan (captain), James Braid, Arthur Havers, Abe Mitchell, James Ockenden, Ted Ray, James Sherlock, J.H. Taylor, Josh Taylor, and Harry Vardon. The American team was: Emmet French (captain), Clarence Hackney, Walter Hagen, Charles Hoffner, Jock Hutchison, Tom Kerrigan, George McLean, Fred McLeod, Bill Mehlhorn and Wilfrid Reid. Gold medals were presented by Katharine Stewart-Murray, Duchess of Atholl, to each member of the teams at the conclusion of the Glasgow Herald tournament on Saturday afternoon. The medals "had on one side crossed flags, The Union Jack and Stars and Stripes surmounted by the inscription "For Britain" or "For America" as the case may be, and on the other side "America v Britain. First international golf match at "The Glasgow Herald" tournament, Gleneagles, 6 June 1921"

After the Glasgow Herald Tournament most of the American team travelled to St Andrews to practice for the British Open, for which qualifying began on 20 June. However, Walter Hagen and Jock Hutchison played in a tournament at Kinghorn on 14 and 15 June. Hagen had a poor first round and didn't turn up for the second day. Hutchison scored 74 and 64 and took the £50 first prize. At St Andrews, Hutchison led the qualifying and then won the Open itself. So, despite losing the International Match, the American team achieved its main objective, winning the British Open.

A match between American and British amateur golfers was played at Royal Liverpool Golf Club (Hoylake) in 1921, immediately before The Amateur Championship. This match was followed by the creation of the Walker Cup, which was first played in 1922. However the 1921 Gleneagles match did not immediately lead to a corresponding match between the professionals.

Wentworth 1926
It was common at this time for a small number of professionals to travel to compete in each other's national championship. In 1926, a larger than usual contingent of American professionals were travelling to Britain to compete in the Open Championship, two weeks before their own Championship. In February it was announced that Walter Hagen would select a team of four American professionals (including himself) to play four British professionals in a match before the Open Championship. The match would be a stroke play competition with each playing the four opposing golfers over 18 holes. In mid-April, it was announced that "A golf enthusiast, who name has not yet been made public" was ready to donate a cup for an annual competition. Later in April it was announced that Samuel Ryder would be presenting a trophy "for annual competition between British and American professionals." with the first match to be played on 4 and 5 June "but the details are not yet decided", and then in May it was announced that the match would be a match-play competition, 8-a-side, foursomes on the first day, singles on the second. Eventually, at Hagen's request, 10 players competed for each team. Samuel Ryder (together with his brother James) had sponsored a number of British professional events starting in 1923.

The match resulted in 13–1 victory for the British team (1 match was halved). The American point was won by Bill Mehlhorn with Emmet French being all square. Medals were presented to the players by the American ambassador Alanson B. Houghton.

The match was widely reported as being for the "Ryder Cup". However Golf Illustrated for 11 June states that because of uncertainty following the general strike in May, which led to uncertainty about how many Americans would be visiting Britain, Samuel Ryder had decided to withhold the cup for a year. It has also been suggested that because Walter Hagen chose the American team rather than the American PGA, that only those Americans who had travelled to Britain to play in the Open were available for selection and that it contained a number of players born outside the United States, also contributed to the feeling that the match ought to be regarded as unofficial. In addition the Americans "had only just landed in England and were not yet in full practice."

The British team was: Ted Ray (Captain), Aubrey Boomer, Archie Compston, George Duncan, George Gadd, Arthur Havers, Herbert Jolly, Abe Mitchell, Fred Robson and Ernest Whitcombe. The American team was: Walter Hagen (Captain), Tommy Armour, Jim Barnes, Emmet French, Joe Kirkwood, Fred McLeod, Bill Mehlhorn, Joe Stein, Cyril Walker and Al Watrous. While all ten of the British players subsequently played in the Ryder Cup only three of the Americans did (Hagen, Mehlhorn and Watrous). Armour, Barnes, Kirkwood, McLeod and Walker were excluded by the policy of requiring players to be born in the USA while French and Stein were never selected.

Worcester 1927

The 1927 competition was organized on a much more formal basis. A Ryder Cup "Deed of Trust" was drawn up formalising the rules of the contest, while each of the PGA organisations had a selection process. In Britain, Golf Illustrated launched a fund to raise £3,000 to fund professional golfers to play in the U.S. Open and the Ryder Cup. Ryder contributed £100 and, when the fund closed with a shortfall of £300, he made up the outstanding balance himself. Although not in the rules at that time, the American PGA restricted their team to those born in the United States.

In early 1928 it became clear that an annual contest was not practical and so it was decided that the second contest should be in 1929 and then every two years thereafter.

For the 1929 UK contest at Moortown GC, Leeds, the American PGA again restricted their team to those born in the USA but in late 1929 the Deed of Trust was revised requiring all players to be born in and resident in their respective countries, as well as being members of their respective Professional Golfers' Association.

Inclusion of continental European golfers
The most significant change to the Ryder Cup has been the inclusion of continental European golfers since 1979. Up until 1977, the matches featured teams representing the United States and Great Britain and Ireland. From 1979 players from continental Europe have been eligible to join what is now known as Team Europe. The change to include continental Europeans arose from discussion in 1977 between Jack Nicklaus and Edward Stanley, 18th Earl of Derby, who was serving as the President of the Professional Golfers' Association; it was suggested by Nicklaus as a means to make the matches more competitive, since the Americans almost always won, often by lopsided margins. From the resumption of competition in 1947 through 1977, Britain had only managed one win and one tie.

The change worked, as the contests soon became much more competitive, with talented young Europeans such as Seve Ballesteros and Bernhard Langer bolstering the European side. The present-day popularity of the Ryder Cup, which now generates enormous media attention, can be said to date from that change in eligibility.

Format
The Ryder Cup involves various match play competitions between players selected from two teams of twelve. It takes place from a Friday to a Sunday with a total of 28 matches being played, all matches being over 18 holes. On Friday and Saturday there are four fourball matches and four foursomes matches each day; a session of four matches in the morning and a session of four matches in the afternoon. On Sunday, there are 12 singles matches, when all team members play. Not all players must play on Friday and Saturday; the captain can select any eight players for each of the sessions over these two days.

The winner of each match scores a point for his team, with half a point each for any match that is tied after the 18 holes. The winning team is determined by cumulative total points. In the event of a tie (14 points each) the Ryder Cup is retained by the team who held it before the contest.

A foursomes match is a competition between two teams of two golfers. On a particular hole the golfers on the same team take alternate shots playing the same ball. One team member tees off on all the odd-numbered holes, and the other on all the even-numbered holes. Each hole is won by the team that completes the hole in the fewest shots. A fourball match is also a competition between two teams of two golfers, but all four golfers play their own ball throughout the round rather than alternating shots. The better score of the two golfers in a team determines the team's score on a particular hole; the score of the other member of the team is not counted. Each hole is won by the team whose individual golfer has the lowest score. A singles match is a standard match play competition between two golfers.

The format of the Ryder Cup has changed over the years. From the inaugural event until 1959, the Ryder Cup was a two-day competition with 36-hole matches. In 1961 the matches were changed to 18 holes each and the number of matches doubled. In 1963 the event was expanded to three days, with fourball matches being played for the first time. This format remained until 1977, when the number of matches was reduced to 20, but, in 1979, the first year continental European players participated, the format was changed to the 28-match version in use today, with 8 foursomes/four-ball matches on the first two days and 12 singles matches on the last day. Because of weather disruption the format of the 2010 contest was altered and it was extended to a fourth day.

The team size was increased from 10 to 12 in 1969.

There were two singles sessions (morning and afternoon) in 1979, but no player played in both sessions.

Since 1979, there have been 4 foursomes and 4 fourballs on each of the first two days. Currently the home captain decides before the contest starts whether the fourball or foursomes matches are played in the morning. He may choose a different order for the two days.

Since 1979, a player can play a maximum of 5 matches (2 foursomes, 2 fourballs and a singles match), however from 1963 to 1975 it was possible to play 6 matches (2 foursomes, 2 fourballs and 2 singles matches).

Team composition

Captains
The captains have always selected the players and chosen the playing order in each group of matches. When the contest involved 36-hole matches, it was usual for the captain to be one of the players. The USA only had two non-playing captains in this period: Walter Hagen in 1937 and Ben Hogan in 1949 while Great Britain had non-playing captains in 1933, 1949, 1951 and 1953. With the change to 18-hole matches and the extension to three days, it became more difficult to combine the roles of captain and player and Arnold Palmer in 1963 was the last playing captain. The captains have always been professional golfers and the only captain who never played in the Ryder Cup was J. H. Taylor, the 1933 British captain.

Qualification and selection
The selection process for the Ryder Cup players has varied over the years. In the early contests the teams were generally decided by a selection committee but later qualification based on performances was introduced. The current system by which most of the team is determined by performances with a small number of players selected by the captain (known as "wild cards" or "captain's picks") gradually evolved and has been used by both sides since 1989.

For the 2014 Ryder Cup both teams had 9 players qualifying based on performances with the remaining 3 players selected by the captain. For those players gaining automatic qualification the Europeans used a system, introduced in 2004, using two tables; one using prize money won in official European Tour events and a second based on World Ranking points gained anywhere in the world. Both tables used a 12-month qualifying period finishing at the end of August. The American system, introduced in 2008, was based on prize money earned in official PGA Tour events during the current season and prize money earned in the major championships in the previous season. The qualifying period ended after the PGA Championship.

For the 2016 Ryder Cup there were a number of changes from 2014 in the American system. The number of captain's picks was increased from three to four with the selections being made later than previously, especially moving the fourth and last pick to less than a week before the Ryder Cup, right after the completion of the Tour Championship. The qualifying events now included both the 2015 World Golf Championships events and The Players Championship, on top of the four major championships, but only included 2016 PGA Tour events actually played in 2016, thus excluded any other event played in 2015. The qualifying period was also extended because the Olympic Games had moved the timeslot for the 2016 PGA Championship which took place already at the end of July. Team Europe retained its old system of qualification and wild cards.

Preliminary events
An opening ceremony takes place on the afternoon before play begins.

Since 2012, there has been a celebrity match played before the Ryder Cup contest. Celebrities were paired with former Ryder Cup captains in 2012 and 2014. Since 2016 there have been separate matches for celebrities and past captains. Celebrities have included sportspeople Michael Phelps, Scottie Pippen, Martina Navratilova, Alessandro Del Piero, A. J. Hawk and Andriy Shevchenko, and actors Bill Murray and Justin Timberlake.

Notable Ryder Cups

1969: Nicklaus vs Jacklin

The 1969 Cup held at Royal Birkdale was perhaps one of the best and most competitive contests in terms of play (18 of the 32 matches went to the last green). It was decided in its very last match, of which United States Captain Sam Snead later said "This is the greatest golf match you have ever seen in England".

With the United States and Great Britain tied at  each, Jack Nicklaus led Tony Jacklin by the score of 1 up as they played the 17th hole. Jacklin made a 35-foot eagle putt and when Nicklaus missed his own eagle try from 12 feet, the match was all square.

At the par-5 finishing hole, both Jacklin and Nicklaus got on the green in two. Nicklaus ran his eagle putt five feet past the hole, while Jacklin left his two-foot short. Nicklaus then sank his birdie putt, and with a crowd of 8,000 people watching, picked up Jacklin's marker, conceding the putt Jacklin needed to tie the matches. As the current holders, the rules meant that the United States retained the trophy. "I don't think you would have missed that putt", Nicklaus said to Jacklin afterwards, "but in these circumstances I would never give you the opportunity."

This gesture of sportsmanship by Nicklaus caused controversy on the American side, some of whom would have preferred to force Jacklin to attempt the putt for the small chance that he might miss, which would have given the United States team an outright win. "All the boys thought it was ridiculous to give him that putt", said Sam Snead. "We went over there to win, not to be good ol' boys."

1989: Azinger and Ballesteros

Held at The Belfry in England, the 1989 Ryder Cup saw the rising of tensions in the series. After holding the cup for more than two decades, the United States team lost both the 1985 and 1987 matches. At the 1989 matches, the pressure was on the United States team and its captain, Raymond Floyd. At a pre-match opening celebration, Floyd slighted the European team by introducing his United States team as "the 12 greatest players in the world."

The competition saw the beginnings of a feud between Seve Ballesteros and Paul Azinger. Early in their singles match, Ballesteros sought to change a scuffed ball for a new ball under Rule of Golf 5–3. Somewhat unusually, Azinger disputed whether the ball was unfit for play. A referee was called, and sided with Azinger in ruling the ball fit for play. Ballesteros reportedly said to Azinger, "Is this the way you want to play today?" The match continued in a contentious fashion, culminating in Ballesteros unusually contesting whether Azinger took a proper drop after hitting into the water on the 18th hole.

The American team's frustration grew as the matches ended in a tie, with the European team retaining the cup.

1991: "The War on the Shore"

The overall tension between the teams and the feud between Ballesteros and Azinger escalated at the Kiawah Island Golf Resort in 1991. At the ceremonial opening dinner, the PGA of America played two videos that were seen as less than hospitable by the European team. The first video was presented as a highlight reel of past Ryder Cups, but reportedly showed only Americans. The second video was a welcoming address by then-United States President George H. W. Bush in which he closed by cheering on the American side.

On the first morning of the competition, Azinger and Chip Beck were paired against Ballesteros and José María Olazábal in a foursomes match, an alternate shot event. Azinger and Beck accused Ballesteros of gamesmanship on account of his throat clearing during Beck's shots. Later in the same match, Azinger and Beck, who were playing the same brand and make of ball but each with a slightly different model, switched their balls. While this switching was unlikely to have resulted in an advantage or to have been intentional, it was in violation of the "one ball rule" which was in effect for the competition. Under that rule, a player is prohibited from changing the type of ball he uses during the course of a match.

A few holes after the switch had occurred, Ballesteros called the Americans for the violation. Azinger, seeming to feel that his integrity was being questioned, said "I can tell you we're not trying to cheat." Ballesteros responded, "Oh no. Breaking the rules and cheating are two different things." As the violation was called too long after it had occurred, no penalty was assessed against the American pair. The constant goading between Ballesteros and Azinger intensified their respective desires to win. Out of that intensity, they and their playing partners produced what may be regarded as one of the best pairs matches in history, with the Spaniards winning 2 & 1. After the matches concluded, Ballesteros reportedly said, "The American team has 11 nice guys. And Paul Azinger."

The 1991 matches received the sobriquet "the War on the Shore" after some excitable advertising in the American media, and intense home-team cheering by the American home crowds. For his part, Corey Pavin caused controversy by sporting a Desert Storm baseball cap during the event in support of the U.S. and coalition war effort in Iraq.

The matches culminated in one of the single most dramatic putts in the history of golf. With only one match remaining to be completed, between Hale Irwin for the United States and Bernhard Langer for the Europeans, the United States team led by one point. Irwin and Langer came to the last hole tied. To win the cup, the American team needed Irwin to win or tie the match by winning or tying the hole. The Europeans could keep the cup with a win by Langer. Both players struggled on the hole, and found themselves facing a pair of putts; Langer had a six-foot, side-hill par putt, and Irwin had a generally uphill, 18-inch putt for bogey. To the surprise of his teammates, Langer conceded Irwin's bogey putt, leaving himself in a must-make position. Langer missed his putt, the match was halved, and the U.S. team took back the cup.

Players on both sides were driven to public tears by the pressure of the matches on the final day. The intense competition of the 1991 Ryder Cup is widely regarded as having elevated public interest in the series.

1999: Battle of Brookline

The 1999 Ryder Cup held at The Country Club in Brookline, Massachusetts, caused great controversy. A remarkable comeback by the American team helped propel the U.S. to a 14–13 victory after trailing 10–6 at the start of the final day. The U.S. defeated Europe 8–3 in the singles matches to seal the first American victory since 1993.

The competition turned on the 17th hole of a match between American Justin Leonard and Spaniard José María Olazábal. With the match all square, Leonard needed to earn at least a half-point to seal an American victory. After Olazábal's second shot left him with a 22-foot putt on the par-4, Leonard hit his shot within 10 feet of the hole and then watched it roll away from the cup, leaving him with a 45-foot putt for birdie. Leonard had made putts of 25 and 35 feet earlier in the round. Leonard holed the putt, and a wild celebration followed with other U.S. players, their wives, and a few fans running onto the green. The putt did not guarantee a half-point for Leonard since Olazábal could still hole his putt and win the last hole. However, Olazábal missed his putt, and the American team celebrated once again, although the second celebration was more reserved than the first one.

There was considerable bad blood after the event, with some of the European players complaining about the behavior of the American galleries throughout the match. Sam Torrance branded it "disgusting", while European captain Mark James referred to it as a "bear pit" in a book recounting the event. There were also reports that a spectator spat at James' wife. Payne Stewart had conceded his singles match to Colin Montgomerie with both players level and on the last green in 2 shots as a response to the abuse Montgomerie had received throughout the match.

Following the 1999 Ryder Cup, many members of the U.S. team apologised for their behavior, and there were numerous attempts by both teams to calm the increasing nationalism of the event.

2012: Medinah

The 39th Ryder Cup was held at the Medinah Country Club in Medinah, Illinois. Under captain José María Olazábal of Spain; the Europeans were down 10–4 after 14 matches, with two four-ball matches still on the course and 12 singles matches to be played the next day. At the end of day two, Ian Poulter made five birdies on the final five holes to give him and Rory McIlroy the point over Jason Dufner and Zach Johnson. Out of the 12 points available on the final day Europe won  points with the U.S. winning only  points. In terms of points this feat matched the Americans' 1999 comeback at Brookline Country Club.

Martin Kaymer struck the putt that retained the cup for Europe. The putt was almost identical in length to the one  that fellow German Bernhard Langer missed at the 1991 Ryder Cup. Francesco Molinari secured the final half-point to win the Ryder Cup outright by winning the 18th hole to halve his match against Tiger Woods. Ian Poulter of the European team finished this Ryder Cup with a perfect 4–0 record.

The event is often referred to as the "Meltdown at Medinah" in the United States or the "Miracle at Medinah" in Europe.

Cancellations and postponements

1939 Ryder Cup
The 1939 Ryder Cup was planned for 18–19 November at Ponte Vedra Country Club in Jacksonville, Florida; Walter Hagen was chosen as non-playing captain of the U.S. team. The competition was cancelled shortly after the outbreak of World War II in Europe in September. It would have been the first Ryder Cup to be held in Florida; the competition was not held there until 1983.

In early April 1939, the British P.G.A. chose a selection committee of six and selected Henry Cotton as captain. In August, eight players were named in the team: Cotton, Jimmy Adams, Dick Burton, Sam King, Alf Padgham, Dai Rees, Charles Whitcombe, and Reg Whitcombe. Charles Whitcombe immediately withdrew from the team, not wishing to travel to the United States. With seven selected, three places were left to be filled. War was declared on 3 September and the British P.G.A. immediately cancelled the match: "The P.G.A. announce that the Ryder Cup match for this year has been cancelled by the state of war prevailing in this country. The P.G.A. of the United States is being informed."

1941, 1943, and 1945 Ryder Cups
The Ryder Cup was not played in these scheduled years due to World War II; by the fall of 1945, many members of the British team were still in the military. After a decade-long absence, it resumed in November 1947 at the Portland Golf Club in Portland, Oregon.

2001 Ryder Cup

The competition, scheduled for 28–30 September at The Belfry's Brabazon Course, was postponed a year because of the September 11 terrorist attacks. "The PGA of America has informed the European Ryder Cup Board that the scope of the last Tuesday's tragedy is so overwhelming that it would not be possible for the United States Ryder Cup team and officials to attend the match this month." The manager of Phil Mickelson and Mark Calcavecchia had earlier announced that the two players would not travel to Europe. Other American players were said to be concerned about attending the event. It was played in 2002 at the original venue with the same teams that had been selected to play a year earlier. The display boards at The Belfry still read "The 2001 Ryder Cup", and U.S. captain Curtis Strange deliberately referred to his team as "The 2001 Ryder Cup Team" in his speech at the closing ceremony.

It was later decided to hold the subsequent Ryder Cup in 2004 (rather than 2003) and thereafter in even-numbered years. This change also affected the men's Presidents Cup and Seve Trophy and women's Solheim Cup competitions, as each switched from even to odd years.

2020 Ryder Cup

In July 2020, the Ryder Cup, scheduled to be held at Whistling Straits in Wisconsin, was postponed for a year due to the COVID-19 pandemic. As a consequence, all future editions of the Ryder Cup are again taking place in odd-numbered years from 2021, as was the case up to 1999. As a consequence, the Presidents Cup and Solheim Cup competitions reverted to even-numbered years from 2022 and 2024 respectively, as were the case up to 2000 and 2002, respectively.

Results

Summary

Although the team was referred to as "Great Britain" up to 1971, a number of golfers from the Republic of Ireland, Northern Ireland, Guernsey and Jersey had played for Great Britain before that date. In 1973, the official team name was changed to "Great Britain and Ireland,” but this was simply a change of name to reflect the fact that golfers from the Republic of Ireland had played in the "Great Britain" Ryder Cup team since Harry Bradshaw in 1953, while Northern Irish players had competed since Fred Daly in 1947.

The team in place of the original "Great Britain" team has been referred to as "Europe" since 1979, when players from continental Europe were included. Since then, the "United States" team has won 9 matches and the "Europe" team has won 11 matches, while retaining the Ryder Cup once with a tie.

Editions

Reference : 2014 Media Guide; Ryder Cup website

Future venues

Future European venues
In 2001, the PGA European Tour decided to put out the Ryder Cup hosting rights from 2018 through 2030 to a competitive bid process throughout Europe.

Television

The Ryder Cup matches were always covered by the BBC, whether in Britain or in the United States, even prior to the British team's merger with Europe. But in the 1970s ITV gained the rights to the Ryder Cup showing the 1973, 1975 in the US and 1977 cups. ITV had the 1979 rights hosted in the US and the first with a European team  but the 1979 cup wasn't televised in the UK due to the 1979 ITV strike. In 1981 the BBC regained the rights covering the 1981, 1983, 1985, 1987, 1989, 1991 and 1993 cups. In the 1990s, Sky Sports became heavily involved in the Ryder Cup, and has since taken over live coverage, including temporarily rebranding their Sky Sports Golf channel  as 'Sky Sports Ryder Cup' for the tournament weekend (since 2014). The BBC still screens edited highlights each night.

In the United States, the Ryder Cup was first televised live at the 1983 matches in Florida, with ABC Sports covering just the final four holes of the singles matches. A highlight package of the 1985 singles matches was produced by ESPN, but no live coverage aired from England. In 1987, with the matches back in the United States, ABC covered both weekend days, but only in the late afternoon.

In 1989, USA Network began a long association with the Ryder Cup, by televising all three days live from England, the first live coverage of a Ryder Cup from Europe. This led to a one-year deal for the 1991 matches in South Carolina to be carried by NBC live on the weekend, with USA Network continuing to provide live coverage of the first day. All five sessions were broadcast for the first time. The success of the 1991 matches led to a contract extension with USA and NBC through 1997, marking a turning point in the competition's popularity. For the European matches, the first two days were taped and aired on delay in the U.S. Another extension with USA and NBC covering the 1999–2003 (later moved to 2004) competitions increased the number of hours of coverage to include the entire first day and most of the second day. Tape delay was still employed for competitions from Europe.

The Ryder Cup's increased success led to a landmark contract with NBC (which had recently bought USA Network) to air the 2006–14 competitions on USA and NBC. It called for a record increase in coverage hours, with the second day now having near-complete coverage. Tape delay was last used for the 2006 event in Ireland. In 2006, ESPN was sub-licensed rights to Friday coverage, as part of a larger transaction between NBC and Disney that also resulted in ABC Sports personality Al Michaels moving to NBC to join their then-upcoming Sunday-night NFL games, ESPN gaining expanded access to highlights from events whose rights are owned by NBC, and Disney acquiring the rights to the cartoon character Oswald the Lucky Rabbit (who was created by Walt Disney in 1927 for a series of animated shorts distributed by Universal Pictures).

In 2013, NBC reached a deal to extend its rights to the Ryder Cup and Senior PGA Championship through 2030, with Friday coverage of the Ryder Cup being assumed by Golf Channel.

For 2018, Golf Channel and NBC had a combined total of 30.5 hours of coverage; Golf Channel had 13.5 hours, and NBC had 17 hours. Ninety minutes of Golf Channel and NBC's time overlapped, amounting to a net total of 29 hours of real time coverage.

For 2021, Golf Channel and NBC had a combined total of 28 hours of coverage; Golf Channel had 12 hours, and NBC had 16 hours. All broadcasts were also shown on Peacock, along with the websites and mobile apps of both NBC Sports and the Ryder Cup.

Records

Most appearances: 12° Phil Mickelson (USA), 1995–2018
Most points: ° Sergio García (Eur) (25–13–7 record)
Most singles points won: 7° Colin Montgomerie (Eur) (6–0–2 record)° Billy Casper (USA) (6–2–2 record)° Lee Trevino (USA) (6–2–2 record)° Arnold Palmer (USA) (6–3–2 record)° Neil Coles (GB, GB&I) (5–6–4 record)
Most foursomes points won: ° Sergio García (Eur) (12–4–3 record)
Most fourball points won: ° Ian Woosnam (Eur) (10–3–1 record)° José María Olazábal (Eur) (9–2–3 record)° Sergio García (Eur) (9–4–3 record)
Most points won by a pairing: 12° Seve Ballesteros and José María Olazábal (Eur) (11–2–2 record)
Top point percentage (minimum of 3 Ryder Cup matches)° Jimmy Demaret (USA) (6–0–0) ° Jack Burke Jr. (USA) (7–1–0) ° Patrick Cantlay (USA) (3–0–1) ° Horton Smith (USA) (3–0–1) ° Walter Hagen (USA) (7–1–1) ° J. C. Snead (USA) (9–2–0) ° Sam Snead (USA) (10–2–1) 
Most points in a single contest: 5° Tony Lema (USA) (5–1–0) 1965° Peter Alliss (GB) (5–1–0) 1965° Gardner Dickinson (USA) (5–0–0) 1967° Arnold Palmer (USA) (5–0–0) 1967° Tony Jacklin (GB) (4–0–2) 1969° Jack Nicklaus (USA) (5–1–0) 1971° Larry Nelson (USA) (5–0–0) 1979° Francesco Molinari (Eur) (5–0–0) 2018° Dustin Johnson (USA) (5–0–0) 2021
Youngest player: ° Sergio García (Eur) 1999
Oldest player: ° Raymond Floyd (USA) 1993

Sources

Traditions
If one of the golfers is injured and cannot play his singles match, the opposing captain can select one player from his team that he would like to not compete. The nominated player is then matched up against the injured player and the match recorded as a half. There is one stipulation – each captain must place the name of their nominated player in an envelope prior to the start of the matches. The "envelope rule", as it has known, has come into play three times since 1979, including most recently in 1993 when Europe's Sam Torrance suffered a sore left foot. Lanny Wadkins offered to be the player that American captain Tom Watson placed in the envelope, and their match was recorded as halved.

Teams have also used the competition to pay tribute to recently deceased legends:

 In 2012 at Medinah, victorious captain Olazábal dedicated the victory to his countryman Ballesteros. The five-time major champion, who had scored 22 points in 37 matches and been part of four victorious European sides before captaining them to victory on home soil at Valderrama in 1997, had died of brain cancer in May 2011 at the age of 54, and in his memory, Team Europe wore navy blue and white garments – his traditional Sunday colors – on the final day, including during the comeback. Additionally, the European kit also bore the silhouette of Ballesteros famously pumping his fist after winning the 1984 Open Championship at the Old Course at St Andrews.
 In 2016 at Hazeltine, both teams paid tribute to Palmer after he passed away five days before the competition at the age of 85 while awaiting heart surgery. The seven-time major champion, who had won more than 22 Ryder Cup matches during five American victories (including one as Team USA's last playing captain) and been the non-playing captain during a sixth, had a video tribute and also opening ceremony tributes from both captains (Love and Clarke) and both honorary captains (Nicklaus and Jacklin), and his bag from the 1975 competition at Laurel Valley was placed on the first tee during Friday's opening foursomes in his honor. Team USA also swept the opening foursomes for the first time since 1975, and after Team USA regained the Cup, Love also dedicated the victory to Palmer. Two days after the competition, the majority of Team USA also attended Palmer's public memorial at St. Vincent College in his hometown of Latrobe, Pennsylvania and brought the Cup at the request of Palmer's daughter Amy.

Similar golf events
The Presidents Cup is similar to the Ryder Cup, except that the competing sides are a U.S. side and an International side from the rest of the world consisting of players who are ineligible for the Ryder Cup. It is held in years when there is no Ryder Cup.

Other team golf events between U.S. and either Europe or Great Britain and Ireland include:

 Curtis Cup – Event for amateur women between a U.S. side and a team drawn from Great Britain and Ireland.
 Junior Ryder Cup – A match between U.S. and European juniors involving both boys and girls.
 Junior Solheim Cup – A match between U.S. and European junior girls.
 PGA Cup – A match between U.S. and Great Britain and Ireland club professionals.
 Solheim Cup – The women's equivalent of the Ryder Cup, featuring the same U.S. against Europe format.
 Walker Cup – Men’s amateur event analogous to the Curtis Cup.

See also

List of American Ryder Cup golfers
List of European Ryder Cup golfers

Notes and references

External links

Official site

 
Team golf tournaments
European Tour events
PGA Tour events
Recurring sporting events established in 1927
Biennial sporting events
1927 establishments in Massachusetts